Lincoln North Star High School (LNS or North Star) is a public secondary school located in Lincoln, Nebraska, United States. It opened its doors in 2003 to 1,150 students, and as of 2021–2022 has approximately 2250 students.

North Star operates on a traditional seven-period day schedule, sometimes with eight periods for those who choose it. The school features a system of academies to assist students with post-secondary planning. The means to implement the academies were provided through federal and local grants. Students may participate in the Science and Engineering Academy, Business and Information Technology Academy, Law and Global Affairs Academy, Health and Biotechnology Academy, and Arts and Communications Academy. Additionally, all freshmen are placed in a separate academy designed to help them transition to high school. North Star was the first Lincoln high school to use this innovative system, which has since been expanded to the other five Lincoln public high schools in the form of Professional Learning Communities.

North Star was originally supposed to be named Lincoln Northwest; every high school in Lincoln is named after a direction depending on where they are located, with the exception of Lincoln High. Before the school opened, the students voted on the name North Star due to the school's location and the positive symbolism and uniqueness of the name. North Star rivals Lincoln High as the most diverse school in Lincoln, Nebraska.

The school's colors are navy blue and burgundy/maroon. Although the official mascot is the North Star Navigator, its mascot is an alligator, nicknamed "Al Gator". Most students seemed to prefer the alligator mascot, and as a result, most locals now refer to the students and interscholastic teams as the Gators.

From its founding in 2003 until 2006, North Star hosted a middle school, North Star Middle School, in a separate wing.

Traditions
North Star has many traditions which have started during its short existence. One of these is the Gator Walk to state, in which the North Star Drumline marches through the school playing cadences and picks up students who have qualified for state events to send them off to their state events. There is also a Gator Walk for all freshmen at the end of the first day of school, as well as a final Gator Walk for graduating seniors, days before graduation. Qualifying state members also receive a "North Star State Qualifier" shirt. North Star is also known for having lunch jams once a quarter, in which certain groups such as the LNS Drumline, the ENT Step Team, or the concert choir perform during lunch to entertain the students.

The Telescope is the high school newspaper.

The cafeteria is nicknamed as the Bayou, the band room is the Bog, and the main gym is called the Swamp, following the theme of the alligator mascot.

References

External links
 LNS homepage

Public high schools in Nebraska
Schools in Lincoln, Nebraska